The 1988 executions of Iranian political prisoners were a series of mass executions of political prisoners across Iran. The order for the executions was given by Ayatollah Khomeini and it was carried out by Iranian officials; starting on 19 July 1988 and continued for approximately five months. The majority of those who were killed were supporters of the People's Mujahedin of Iran, but supporters of other leftist factions, including the Fedaian and the Tudeh Party of Iran (Communist Party), were also executed. The killings operated outside legislation and trials were not concerned with establishing the guilt or innocence of defendants. The massacres have been called "Iran’s greatest crime against humanity."

According to Amnesty International and other sources, "thousands of political dissidents were systematically subjected to enforced disappearance in Iranian detention facilities across the country and extrajudicially executed pursuant to an order issued by the Supreme Leader of Iran and implemented across prisons in the country. Many of those killed during this time were subjected to torture and other cruel, inhuman and degrading treatment or punishment in the process." The killings have been described as a political purge without precedent in modern Iranian history, both in terms of scope and cover-up.

The exact number of prisoners who were executed remains a point of contention. After interviewing the relatives of dozens of prisoners, Amnesty International estimated that the number of prisoners who were executed ran into the thousands; and the then-Supreme Leader Ruhollah Khomeini's deputy, Hussein-Ali Montazeri put the number of prisoners who were executed at between 2,800 and 3,800 in his memoirs, but according to other estimates, as many as 30,000 individuals were executed. Because the number of prisoners who were going to be executed was extremely large, the prisoners were loaded into forklift trucks in groups of six and hanged from cranes in half-hour intervals.

Great care was taken to conceal the killings, and the government of Iran currently denies their occurrence. Ayatollah Montazeri wrote to Ayatollah Khomeini saying "A large number of prisoners have been killed under torture by interrogators ... in some prisons of the Islamic Republic young girls are being raped ... As a result of unruly torture, many prisoners have become deaf or paralyzed or afflicted with chronic diseases." There were various motives for the executions of the victims, including that the victims were executed in retaliation for the 1988 attack on the western borders of Iran by the People's Mujahedin of Iran. However, this theory does not account for the fact that members of other leftist groups which never supported or took part in the Mujahedin's invasion were also targeted for execution. Survivors of the massacre have made numerous calls for redress and they have also called for the prosecution of those who perpetrated the massacre. Canada called the event a crime against humanity, and Italy made similar declarations for justice to be served.

Background

In order to eliminate potential political oppositions, the Islamic Republic started coordinated extrajudicial killings in Iran. Following Operation Mersad, a military attack on Iranian forces by the People's Mojahedin Organization of Iran (MEK) desiring to gather Iranian opposition at home and overthrow the Islamic Republic, a large number of prisoners from the MEK were executed along with many other individuals from other leftist opposition groups. Khomeini used the MEK's failed invasion as a pretext for the mass execution of thousands of MEK members "who remained steadfast in their support for the MEK" and other leftists in Iranian jails through a fatwa. The executions were carried out by several high-ranking members of Iran's current government.

In 2016, an audio recording was posted online of a high-level official meeting that took place in August 1988 between Hossein Ali Montazeri and the officials responsible for the mass killings in Tehran. In the recording, Hossein Ali Montazeri is heard saying that the ministry of intelligence used the MEK's armed incursion as a pretext to carry out the mass killings, which "had been under consideration for several years". Iranian authorities have dismissed the incident as "nothing but propaganda", presenting the executions as a lawful response to a small group of incarcerated individuals who had colluded with the MEK to support its 25 July 1988 incursion.

According to the US State Department, the "death commissions" responsible for the 1988 executions of Iranian political prisoners started on 19 July (1988) and included the current head of the Iranian judiciary and current Minister of Justice. According to Amnesty International, "thousands of political dissidents were systematically subjected to enforced disappearance in Iranian detention facilities across the country and extrajudicially executed pursuant to an order issued by the Supreme Leader of Iran and implemented across prisons in the country. Many of those killed during this time were subjected to torture and other cruel, inhuman and degrading treatment or punishment in the process."

Massacre

Khomeini's order 

Shortly before the executions commenced, Iranian leader Ruhollah Khomeini issued "a secret but extraordinary order – some suspect a formal fatwa." This order led to the creation of "Special Commissions with instructions to execute members of People's Mojahedin Organization of Iran as moharebs (those who war against Allah) and leftists as mortads (apostates from Islam)."

In part, the letter reads as follows:

[In the Name of God,
The Compassionate, the Merciful,]
As the treacherous Monafeqin [Mojahedin] do not believe in Islam and what they say is out of deception and hypocrisy, and 
As their leaders have confessed that they have become renegades, and 
As they are waging war on God, and 
As they are engaging in classical warfare in the western, the northern and the southern fronts, and 
As they are collaborating with the Baathist Party of Iraq and spying for Saddam against our Muslim nation, and 
As they are tied to the World Arrogance, and in light of their cowardly blows to the Islamic Republic since its inception,
It is decreed that those who are in prison throughout the country and remain steadfast in their support for the Monafeqin [Mojahedin] are waging war on God and are condemned to execution.

Administering of the executions 
In Tehran the special commission for the executions had 16 members representing the various authorities of the Islamic government – Imam Khomeini himself, the president, the chief prosecutor, the Revolutionary Tribunals, the Ministries of Justice and Intelligence, and the administration of Evin and Gohar Dasht, the two prisons in the Tehran area from which the prisoners were eliminated. The chair of the commission was Ayatollah Morteza Eshraqi. His two special assistants were Hojatt al-Islam Hossein-Ali Nayyeri and Hojjat al-Islam Ali Mobasheri. The commission shuttled back and forth between Evin and Gohar Dasht prisons by helicopter. In the provinces similar commissions were established, but less is known about them.

Another description of the administration of the executions has it implemented by a "four-man commission, later known as the 'death committee'." Members were Hossein-Ali Nayyeri (who was then a judge), Morteza Eshraqi (then Tehran Prosecutor), Ebrahim Raisi (then Deputy Prosecutor General) and Mostafa Pourmohammadi (then the representative of the Intelligence Ministry in Evin Prison). Ebrahim Raisi went on to campaign for president of Iran in 2017 as a hard-line conservative where he was criticized for his role in the executions, before being elected as president on his second try in 2021.

Amnesty International identified and analyzed evidence that linked several Iranian officials to participating in the massacre. These included Alireza Avayi (tasked to participate in the so-called "death commission" of Dezful), Ebrahim Raisi (member of the "death commission" in Tehran), Mostafa Pour Mohammadi, and others.

The prisoners were not executed without any proceedings, but were "tried" on charges totally unrelated to the charges that had landed them in prison. They were interviewed by commissions with a set list of questions to see if they qualified as moharebs or mortads to the satisfaction of that commission. Many, if not most, of the prisoners were unaware of the true purpose of the questions, although later some were warned by the prison grapevine.

Some of the victims were killed because of their beliefs about religion – because they were atheists or because they were Muslims who followed different versions of Islam.

Isolation of the prisoners 
Some scholarly examinations of the massacre argue that the planning stages of the 1988 Massacre began months before the actual executions started. According to one report: "prison officials took the unusual step in late 1987 and early 1988 of re-questioning and separating all political prisoners according to party affiliation and length of sentence."

The actual execution process began in the early hours of 19 July 1988 with the isolation of the political prisoners from the outside world. According to Ervand Abrahamian, Iranian authorities suddenly isolated major prisons on 19 July, having its courts of law go on an unscheduled holiday to avoid relatives finding out about those imprisoned. Prison gates were closed, scheduled visits and telephone calls were canceled, letters, care packages, and even vital medicines from the outside were turned away. Relatives of prisoners were forbidden to congregate outside the prison gates.

Inside the prison, cell blocks were isolated from each other and cleared of radios and televisions. Places where prisoners gathered communally, such as lecture halls, workshops, infirmaries, were all closed down and inmates were confined to their cells. Prison guards and workers were ordered not to speak to prisoners. One prisoner constructed a homemade wireless set to listen to the radio news from the outside but found news broadcasters were saying nothing at all about the lockdown.

Dealing with the MEK (People's Mojahedin Organization of Iran) 

Prisoners were initially told that this was not a trial but a process for initiating a general amnesty and separating the Muslims from the non-Muslims. Prisoners were asked if they were willing to denounce the MEK before cameras, help the IRI hunt down MEK members, name secret sympathizers, identify phoney repenters, or go to the war front and walk through enemy minefields. According to Abrahamian, the questions were designed to "tax to the utmost the victim's sense of decency, honor, and self-respect". The Mojahedin who gave unsatisfactory answers were promptly taken to a special room and later hanged in batches of six. At first this secrecy was effective. One survivor thought the purpose of his interview was to be released in time for the forthcoming peace celebrations.

Most of the prisoners executed were serving prison terms for peaceful protest activities (distributing opposition newspapers and leaflets, taking part in demonstrations, or collecting donations for political oppositions) or holding outlawed political views. The executions did not conform with existing legislation, took place without any proven "internationally recognized criminal offence", and have since been termed a "crime against humanity" by the standards of international law. Those executed included children.

Human rights organizations say that the number of those executed remains a point of contention. Prisoners were charged with "moharebeh" or "waging war on God" and those who said to be affiliated with the MEK, including children as young as 13 years old, were hanged from cranes by Ayatollah Khomeini's direct orders. The Iranian government accused those investigating the executions of "disclosing state secrets" and threatening national security". According to Amnesty International, "there has also been an ongoing campaign by the Islamic Republic to demonize victims, distort facts, and repress family survivors and human rights defenders. In 2019, Maryam Rajavi, released a book named "Crime Against Humanity". The book is about the 1988 massacres of political prisoners in Iran, listing the location of 36 Iranian mass graves and explaining that about 30,000 people were executed, with the majority being MEK members.

Dealing with leftists 
After 27 August, the commission turned its attention to the leftist prisoners, such as members of the Tudeh, Majority Fedayi, Minority Fedayi, other Fedayi, Kumaleh, Rah-e Kargar, Peykar. These were also assured they were in no danger and asked: 

"Are you a Muslim?"
"Do you believe in Allah?"
"Is the Holy Qur'an the Word of Allah?"
"Do you believe in Heaven and Hell?"
"Do you accept the Holy Muhammad to be the Seal of the Prophets?"
"Will you publicly recant historical materialism?"
"Will you denounce your former beliefs before the cameras?"
"Do you fast during Ramadan?"
"Do you pray and read the Holy Qur'an?"
"Would you rather share a cell with a Muslim or a non-Muslim?"
"Will you sign an affidavit that you believe in Allah, the Prophet, the Holy Qur'an, and the Resurrection?"
"When you were growing up, did your father pray, fast, and read the Holy Qur'an?"

Prisoners were told that authorities were asking them these questions because they planned to separate practicing Muslims from non-practicing ones. However, the real reason was to determine whether the prisoners qualified as apostates from Islam, in which case they would join the moharebs in the gallows.

Some prisoners saved from execution by answering the questions properly returned to their cells and passed along what the commission was asking. A leftist prisoner who had once attended a seminary realised the theological significance of the questions, and sent morse code messages to other cells, warning of the dangers, by knocking on the prison walls. The questioners wanted to know if prisoners' fathers prayed, fasted, and read the Qur'an because the sons of devout men could be called apostates. If they had not been raised in proper Muslim homes first and "exposed to true Islam," they could not be apostates. Another wrong answer was refusing to reply on the grounds of 'privacy', a response which was often taken as an admission of apostasy.

All this was a surprise to the prisoners, with one commenting: "In previous years, they wanted us to confess to spying. In 1988, they wanted us to convert to Islam." It also meant there was no correlation between the length of sentence being served and the likelihood of death. The first leftist to go before the commission were those with short sentences, some even completed. These had no warning of what was in store and many died.

Dealing with women 
Mojahedin women were given equal treatment with Mojahedin men, almost all hanged as 'armed enemies of Allah'. However, for apostasy the punishment for women was different and lighter than that for men.  Since according to the commission's interpretation of Islamic law, women were not fully responsible for their actions, "disobedient women – including apostates – could be given discretionary punishments to mend their ways and obey male superiors."

Leftist women—even those raised as practicing Muslims—were given another 'opportunity' to recant their 'apostasy.'  "After the investigation, leftist women began to receive five lashes every day -- one for each of the five daily prayers missed that day, half the punishment meted out to the men. After a while, many agreed to pray, but some went on hunger strike, refusing even water. One died after 22 days and 550 lashes, and the authorities certified her death as suicide because it was 'she who had made the decision not to pray.'"

Families 
According to Iranian human rights lawyer Shirin Ebadi, executed prisoner's families were told that they would not be permitted to hold a funeral or mourn publicly for one year. After that time, if their conduct was deemed acceptable by the authorities, they would be told the place of burial. The justification given to these families for the execution of their loved ones was that the prisoner's name had appeared on notes pinned to PMOI members killed in the Mersad attack whose bodies had been recovered by Iranian Islamic officials. The notes listing the PMOI's supporters' in prison so the prisoners had been guilty of aiding the attack. Ebadi complained that aside from being improbable, this did not explain why the prisoners had not received a trial for the charge of giving support to the enemy. In 2009, the Abdorrahman Boroumand Center commissioned Geoffrey Robertson QC to write a legal opinion based on evidence and witness testimonies gathered by the center. Robertson's final report accused Tehran of continuing to deny relatives of the victims their right to know where their loved ones are buried.

Estimates of the number of fatalities 
One anonymous ex-prisoner places the death toll in the 'thousands.'  Another eyewitness estimates that between 5,000 and 6,000 individuals were killed – 1,000 of them were leftists and the rest of them were Mojahedin. Yet another estimate it in the 'thousands', with as many as 1,500 killed at Gohar Dasht prison alone. A recent study using scattered information from the provinces places the figure at 12,000. Amnesty International estimates that the national total is more than 2,500 and describes the vast majority of the victims as 'prisoners of conscience' as they had not been charged with actual deeds or plans of deeds against the state.

It is extremely difficult to estimate an accurate death toll because many of the killings were carried out in remote Kurdish and Baluchi cities. It could be as high as 30,000 according to figures which were provided by Iranian defectors. In the aftermath of the 2009 uprisings in Iran, Mohammad Nurizad, a defector from the Iranian regime stated that over 33,000 people were massacred within 2–3 months in the summer of 1988. It is estimated that most of those who were executed were either high school or college students or fresh graduates, and over 10% of them were women. According to Christina Lamb, writing in The Telegraph: "Secret documents smuggled out of Iran reveal that, because of the large numbers of necks to be broken, prisoners were loaded onto forklift trucks in groups of six and hanged from cranes in half-hourly intervals."

International reaction and criticism 
On 30 August 2017, the United Nations Human Rights Council highlighted the 1988 massacre and distributed a written statement by three non-governmental organizations titled, "The 1988 Massacre of Political Prisoners in Iran: Time for the Truth, Justice, Reparation and Guarantees of Non-Recurrence" The  statement points to the following: In 1988, the government of Iran massacred 30,000 political prisoners. The executions took place based on a fatwa by Supreme Leader Ayatollah Khomeini. Three-member commissions known as a 'Death Commission' were formed across Iran sending political prisoners who refused to abandon their beliefs to execution. The victims were buried in secret mass graves. The perpetrators continue to enjoy impunity.

Another joint written statement by five NGOs with consultative status with the United Nations was circulated during the UN Human Rights Council in February 2018 urged "UN to launch fact-finding mission to investigate Iran's 1988 massacre in order to end impunity and prevent the same fate for detained protesters."

On 4 December 2018 Amnesty International asked the government of Iran to bring to light what happened to the political detainees in the country. Amnesty asked the United Nations to set up an investigation group to find the facts of crimes against humanity in Iran.

In November 2019, Sweden arrested Hamid Nouri, accused of being an assistant prosecutor during the massacres and playing a key role during the mass executions. UN Special Rapporteur Agnès Callamard stated that Nouri's arrest was the first time that someone was held responsible for the mass killings. His trial, initially scheduled to begin in June 2021, began August 2021.
According to an indictment, Noury is accused of "torturing prisoners and subjecting them to inhumane conditions". In July 2022 he was sentenced to life in prison.

Response

Montazeri 

One of the consequences of the killings was the resignation of Hussein-Ali Montazeri as the heir-designate to Ayatollah Khomeini as Supreme Leader of Iran.
Prior to the killings, Montazeri "had taken issue with the diehard cleric on a number of subjects – the trial of Mehdi Hashemi, the anti-hoarding campaign ..." When he heard of the killings Montazeri rushed off three public letters – two to Khomeini, one to the Special Commission – denouncing the executions "in no uncertain terms." Montazeri also wrote to Khomeini saying "at least order to spare women who have children ... the execution of several thousand prisoners in a few days will not reflect positively and will not be mistake-free".

He also took the Special Commission "to task for violating Islam by executing repenters and minor offenders who in a proper court of law would have received a mere reprimand." Montazeri warned Khomeini: "The execution of several thousand prisoners in a few days will not have positive repercussions and will not be mistake-free."

Montazeri was asked to resign, with Khomeini maintaining he had always been doubtful of Montazeri's competence and that 'I expressed reservations when the Assembly of Experts first appointed you.'" But the Assembly of Experts had insisted on naming Montazeri the future Supreme Leader.

The regime published letters between the two Ayatollahs but "the selection dealt only with the Hashemi affair and scrupulously avoided the mass executions – thus observing the official line that these executions never took place."

On 9 August 2016, a website run by followers of Montazeri published an audio recording from a meeting he held on 15 August 1988 with the special judicial tribunal (Tehran Prosecutor Morteza Eshraghi, Judge Hossein-Ali Nayeri, Deputy Prosecutor General Ebrahim Raeesi and MOIS representative in Evin Mostafa Pourmohammadi). One can hear Montazeri condemning the mass executions. The Ministry of Intelligence and Security (MOIS) had the recording taken down the day after its release.
According to Human Rights Watch, the tape had been released by Ayatollah Montazeri's son, Ahmed Montazeri. After the release of the audiotape, Iran's Special Court of Clergy charged Ahmed Montazeri with "spreading propaganda against the system" and "revealing plans, secrets or decisions regarding the state’s domestic or foreign policies… in a manner amounting to espionage." He was later sentenced to 21 years in prison, but the sentence was suspended.

Iranian government's position 

Mostafa Pourmohammadi, who was speaking in the administrative council meeting in the city of Khorram-Abad in Lorestan province, on 28 August 2016 said: "We are proud we have implemented God's order about Mojahedin (PMOI or MEK)." In 2017 Ali Khamenei defended the executions, stating that those killed were "terrorists" and "hypocrites".

The Iranian government accused those who were investigating the killings of  "disclosing state secrets" and "threatening national security". According to Amnesty International, the Islamic Republic has engaged in an ongoing campaign to demonize victims, distort facts, silence family members of victims, silence survivors and silence human rights defenders.

Officials implicated in the massacre have subsequently enjoyed promotions. Public awareness about the massacres and widespread condemnation have "compelled the Islamic Republic to engage in a damage-containment propaganda exercise."

Other criticisms 
One complaint which was made against the mass killings was that almost all of the prisoners who were executed had been arrested for relatively minor offenses, since those who had been charged with committing serious crimes had already been executed. The 1988 killings resembled the 'disappearances' of prisoners in 20th-century Latin America.

The "Islamic Revolutionary Courts" have been criticized "for holding unfair, secret summary trials without any semblance of due process and in violation of international human rights standards".

According to Kaveh Shahrooz, "it is baffling that two of the world's most powerful human rights organizations, Amnesty International and Human Rights Watch, have simply never written full reports on a crime as widespread as the 1988 extermination campaign."

While Amnesty International's report "Iran: Violations of Human Rights 1987-1990" which was published in 1990 devotes a few pages to the massacre, the human rights organization has never written a full report on the killings. The Amnesty International report states:
The political executions took place in many prisons in all parts of Iran, often far from where the armed incursion took place. Most of the executions were of political prisoners, including an unknown number of prisoners of conscience, who had already served a number of years in prison. They could have played no part in the armed incursion, and they were in no position to take part in spying or terrorist activities. Many of the dead had been tried and sentenced to prison terms during the early 1980s, many for non-violent offences such as distributing newspapers and leaflets, taking part in demonstrations or collecting funds for prisoners' families. Many of the dead had been students in their teens or early twenties at the time of their arrest. The majority of those killed were supporters of the PMOI, but hundreds of members and supporters of other political groups, including various factions of the PFOI, the Tudeh Party, the KDPI, Rah-e Kargar and others, were also among the execution victims.

Similarly, Human Rights Watch devotes a mere handful of pages to the massacre in a background report concerning President Ahmadinejad's cabinet picks.

Human Rights Watch (HRW) described the executions as "deliberate and systematic ... extrajudicial killings," and condemned them as crimes against humanity. HRW also accused Mustafa Pour-Mohammadi, Iran's Interior Minister from 2005 to 2008, of direct involvement in the killings.

UN judge and human rights lawyer Geoffrey Robertson QC urged the UN Security Council to set up a special court, along the lines of the International Tribunals for Yugoslavia and Rwanda, to try the men who were involved "for one of the worst single human rights atrocities since the Second World War."

Motivation 

A 2018 research by Amnesty International found that Ruhollah Khomeini had ordered the torture and execution of thousands of political prisoners through a secret fatwa. In 2016, an audio recording was posted online of a high-level official meeting that took place in August 1988 between Hossein Ali Montazeri and the officials responsible for the mass killings in Tehran. In the recording, Hossein Ali Montazeri is heard saying that the ministry of intelligence used the MEK's armed incursion as a pretext to carry out the mass killings, which "had been under consideration for several years."
 
Scholars disagree over why the prisoners were killed. Ali Akbar Mahdi believes the intense overcrowding of Iranian prisons and the July 1988 Mojahedin Operation Mersad offensive "had much to do" with the massacre. Ervand Abrahamian believes the "regime's internal dynamics" were responsible – the need for "a glue" to hold "together his disparate followers" and a "bloodbath" to "purge" moderates like Montazeri and prevent any future "détente with the West" from destroying his legacy. In particular the killings destroyed any ties, or possibility of ties, between populists in the Khomeini movement on the one hand, and non-Khomeiniist Islamist and secular leftists on the other. Khomeini had been concerned that "some of his followers had toyed with the dangerous notion of working with the Tudeh Party to incorporate more radical clauses into the Labor Law as well as into the Land Reform Law" earlier.

Iran Tribunal 
In 2012, the families of the victims, along with the survivors of the mass executions initiated an international Commission, the Iran Tribunal, in order to investigate the mass killing of Iran's political prisoners. "Iran Tribunal" is aiming to hold Iran's government accountable on charges of crimes against humanity. The first session of court hearing was organized in London and the second one at The Hague Peace Palace.

See also 

Khavaran cemetery
Mothers of Khavaran
Freedom of speech in Iran
History of the Islamic Republic of Iran
Human rights in the Islamic Republic of Iran
Chain murders of Iran
StopExecutionsinIran
Trial of Hamid Nouri
Iranian Green Movement
2009 Iranian presidential election protests
2017–2021 Iranian protests
2021–2022 Iranian protests
Mahsa Amini protests
Politics of Iran

References

Further reading 
 Abrahamian Ervand. Tortured Confessions. Berkeley, Cal.: University of California Press, 1999. 
 Afshari Reza. Human Rights in Iran. The Abuse of Cultural Relativism. 2001. 
  Shahrooz, Kaveh With Revolutionary Rage and Rancor: A Preliminary Report on the 1988 Massacre of Iran's Political Pr Human Rights Journal, Volume 20
  Final Report on the situation of human rights in the Islamic Republic of Iran by the Special Representative of the Commission on Human Rights  Mr. Reynaldo Galindo Pohl, pursuant to Commission resolution 1992/67 of 4 March 1992. Document number E/CN.4/1993/41
 Cooper, Roger. Death Plus Ten Years (Paperback). Harpercollins; New Ed edition (May 1995) 
 Rejali, Darius. Torture and Modernity: Self, society and state in modern Iran. Westview Press 1994.

External links 

 "With Revolutionary Rage and Rancor: A Preliminary Report on the 1988 Massacre of Iran's Political Prisoners". Harvard Human Rights Journal, Volume 20
 The Secret Fatwa: The untold story of the 1988 massacre in Iran (documentary film)
Marked for death  Some of Assassinations 1979–96
Hossein Mokhtar's Testimony
The 16th Anniversary of the Massacre of Political Prisoners in Iran
It must not happen again!  September 2003
Watching the watcher by Ramin Ahmadi  (Iranian.com)
Admit it
 Association of Iranian Political Prisoners (in exile) has a home page in English, Swedish and Persian at کانون زندانیان سیاسی ایران - در تبعید . Under the title "Documents" there are many references to the 1988 massacre.
Photo Gallery: Court Hearing in The Hague for 1980s Massacre in Persia (Persian Dutch Network,Oct. 2012)
Ex-Khamenei advisor confirms 33,000 executed during 1988 massacre of political prisoners in Iran, May 2014)
پورمحمدی درباره اعدام‌های ۶۷: افتخار می‌کنیم حکم خدا را اجرا کردیم

Fatwas
Islamic courts and tribunals
History of the Islamic Republic of Iran
Human rights abuses in Iran
Mass murder in 1988
Executions
Iranian war crimes
People executed by Iran
Political and cultural purges
Massacres in Iran
Political repression in Iran
People's Mojahedin Organization of Iran
Iran–Iraq War crimes
Political imprisonment in Iran